is a Japanese shōjo manga series by Natsumi Itsuki. It won the 21st Kodansha Manga Award for shōjo. It was adapted in 1997 into an OVA series.

Plot summary

Kuraki Fuzuchi is a handsome and quiet young man who has immense psychic powers and sword skills. He meets Takeo Nanachi, a college student with similar powers.

The story opens with Nanachi traveling to a small shrine in the mountains to purify his deceased grandfather's sword in a festival that only occurs every 49 years. There he meets Kuraki and later accidentally stumbles upon Kuraki's initiation ritual as a Shaman. From there on, their lives are inexplicitly intertwined as they encounter ghosts, spirits, demons, and other characters with supernatural powers while the author provides a parallel running story depicting their previous life.

References

External links

1992 manga
1997 anime OVAs
Hakusensha franchises
Pierrot (company)
Shōjo manga
Winner of Kodansha Manga Award (Shōjo)
Natsumi Itsuki
Hakusensha manga